The Gorge is a civil parish in the district of Telford and Wrekin, Shropshire, England.  It contains 215 listed buildings that are recorded in the National Heritage List for England.  Of these, two are listed at Grade I, the highest of the three grades, 13 are at Grade II*, the middle grade, and the others are at Grade II, the lowest grade.  The River Severn runs through the parish and, together with a tributary running from the north, form Ironbridge Gorge, which contains the town of Ironbridge, and the villages of Coalbrookdale, Coalport and part of Jackfield.

Until the coming of the Industrial Revolution the parish was rural, and the listed buildings from this period consist of timber framed houses and cottages.  In 1708 Abraham Darby I moved to Coalbrookdale and took over an disused blast furnace. He developed this into The Old Furnace in which he smelted iron with coke for the first time in the world in 1709.  From this, Coalbrookdale Ironworks developed and a number of buildings associated with it are listed.  The iron for The Iron Bridge at Ironbridge, the first major bridge in the world to be built from cast iron in 1777–80, was smelted at Coalbrookdale, to be followed soon by Coalport Bridge in 1780; both bridges are listed.  These bridges and some of the surviving strictures associated with the early iron industry are also Scheduled Monuments.

Following the construction of The Old Bridge, the town of Ironbridge grew, and many of the listed buildings in the town are houses, shops and other buildings constructed in the late 18th century and the early 19th century.  Apart from structures associated with the iron industry, houses, cottages, and shops, the other listed buildings in the parish include public houses and hotels, churches, chapels and schools, structures associated with the wharf at Ironbridge, toll houses, Coalport China works, public buildings, a burial ground, warehouses, more bridges, level crossing gates, a former workhouse, lamp posts, a war memorial, and a telephone kiosk.


Key

Buildings

References

Citations

Sources

Lists of buildings and structures in Shropshire